The canton of Imphy is an administrative division of the Nièvre department in central France. Its borders were modified at the French canton reorganization that came into effect in March 2015. Its seat is in Imphy.

It consists of the following communes:
 
Béard
Druy-Parigny
Imphy
La Machine
Saint-Ouen-sur-Loire
Sauvigny-les-Bois
Sougy-sur-Loire
Thianges
Trois-Vèvres

References

Cantons of Nièvre